Amerigo Steven "Tony" Tonelli (September 1, 1917 – January 30, 1987) was an American football player. 

Tonelli was born in Wheeling, West Virginia, in 1917. He attended Thomas High School in West Virginia. He next enrolled at the University of Southern California and played at the center position for the USC Trojans football team fro 1935 to 1938. He returned from a knee injury sustained during the 1938 season to play for USC in the 1939 Rose Bowl. He went on to block a punt in the Rose Bowl.

He was selected by the Detroit Lions with the 177th pick in the 1939 NFL Draft. He appeared in nine games as a center and guard for the Lions during the 1939 season.

After his playing career ended, Tonelli worked for a time as a coach. He then joined the United States Air Force and attained the rank of lieutenant colonel. He died in 1987 in Newport Beach, California, at age 69.

References

1917 births
1987 deaths
Sportspeople from Wheeling, West Virginia
American football centers
USC Trojans football players
Detroit Lions players
Players of American football from West Virginia
People from Tucker County, West Virginia